The Westover Historic District is a national historic district located at Westover, Arlington County, Virginia. It contains 383 contributing buildings and 1 contributing site in a residential neighborhood in northern Arlington. The neighborhood was constructed in five phases between 1939 and 1957: Westover Apartments, Westover Hills, Keene's Addition to Westover, Westover Park, and Mason's Addition to Westover. The neighborhood consists of Colonial Revival-style single-family dwellings, twin houses, duplexes, and multi-family garden apartments.  Also in the district are a shopping center, the Claude A. Swanson Junior High School, the Westover Baptist Church, and Swanson Park.

It was listed on the National Register of Historic Places in 2006.

References

Residential buildings on the National Register of Historic Places in Virginia
Colonial Revival architecture in Virginia
Historic districts in Arlington County, Virginia
National Register of Historic Places in Arlington County, Virginia
Historic districts on the National Register of Historic Places in Virginia